Strange Boy may refer to:
"Strange Boy", a song by Dala from the album This Moment Is a Flash
Strange Boy, an album by Kate Davis
"A Strange Boy", a song by Joni Mitchell from the album Hejira

See also
The Strange Boys, American rock band